Elections took place for Fermanagh and Omagh District Council on 2 May 2019, part of that year's local elections. 40 Councillors were elected via STV.

Sinn Féin emerged as the largest party with Fifteen seats, six ahead of the Ulster Unionist Party and six seats away from overall control. The Alliance Party and Cross-Community Labour Alternative both gained representation onto the council for the first time.

Election results

Note: "Votes" are the first preference votes.

The overall turnout was 61.57% with a total of 51,913 valid votes cast. A total of 707 ballots were rejected.

Districts summary

|- class="unsortable" align="centre"
!rowspan=2 align="left"|Ward
! % 
!Cllrs
! %
!Cllrs
! %
!Cllrs
! %
!Cllrs
! %
!Cllrs
! % 
!Cllrs
!rowspan=2|TotalCllrs
|- class="unsortable" align="center"
!colspan=2 bgcolor="" | Sinn Féin
!colspan=2 bgcolor="" | UUP
!colspan=2 bgcolor="" | DUP
!colspan=2 bgcolor=""| SDLP
!colspan=2 bgcolor="" | Alliance
!colspan=2 bgcolor="white"| Others
|-
|align="left"|Enniskillen
|bgcolor="#008800"|23.6
|bgcolor="#008800"|1
|19.4
|2
|20.8
|1
|13.2
|1
|4.3
|0
|18.7
|1
|6
|-
|align="left"|Erne East
|bgcolor="#008800"|38.1
|bgcolor="#008800"|2
|16.0
|1
|16.3
|1
|9.9
|1
|0.0
|0
|19.7
|1
|6
|-
|align="left"|Erne North
|bgcolor="#008800"|26.6
|bgcolor="#008800"|1
|26.5
|2
|20.4
|1
|13.3
|1
|6.0
|0
|7.1
|0
|5
|-
|align="left"|Erne West
|bgcolor="#008800"|43.6
|bgcolor="#008800"|2
|18.1
|1
|7.4
|0
|8.3
|1
|0.0
|0
|22.6
|1
|5
|-
|align="left"|Mid Tyrone
|bgcolor="#008800"|48.4
|bgcolor="#008800"|4
|12.1
|1
|11.5
|0
|7.4
|0
|3.8
|0
|16.8
|1
|6
|-
|align="left"|Omagh
|bgcolor="#008800"|31.4
|bgcolor="#008800"|2
|9.9
|1
|15.2
|1
|8.1
|0
|9.7
|1
|25.7
|1
|6
|-
|align="left"|West Tyrone
|bgcolor="#008800"|42.8
|bgcolor="#008800"|3
|14.5
|1
|20.5
|1
|13.9
|1
|5.2
|0
|3.2
|0
|6
|-
|- class="unsortable" class="sortbottom" style="background:#C9C9C9"
|align="left"| Total
|36.8
|15
|16.6
|9
|15.9
|5
|10.5
|5
|3.3
|1
|14.7
|5
|40
|-
|}

District results

Enniskillen

2014: 2 x UUP, 2 x Sinn Féin, 1 x DUP, 1 x SDLP
2019: 2 x UUP, 1 x Sinn Féin, 1 x DUP, 1 x SDLP, 1 x Cross-Community Labour Alternative
2014-2019 Change: Cross-Community Labour Alternative gain from Sinn Féin

Erne East

2014: 3 x Sinn Féin, 1 x DUP, 1 x UUP, 1 x SDLP
2019: 2 x Sinn Féin, 1 x DUP, 1 x UUP, 1 x SDLP, 1 x Independent
2014-2019 Change: Independent gain from Sinn Féin

Erne North

2014: 2 x UUP, 1 x DUP, 1 x Sinn Féin, 1 x SDLP
2019: 2 x UUP, 1 x DUP, 1 x Sinn Féin, 1 x SDLP
2014-2019 Change: No change

Erne West

2014: 2 x Sinn Féin, 1 x SDLP, 1 x UUP, 1 x Independent
2019: 2 x Sinn Féin, 1 x SDLP, 1 x UUP, 1 x Independent
2014-2019 Change: No change

Mid Tyrone

2014: 4 x Sinn Féin, 1 x UUP, 1 x SDLP
2019: 4 x Sinn Féin, 1 x UUP, 1 x Independent
2014-2019 Change: Independent gain from SDLP

Omagh

2014: 2 x Sinn Féin, 2 x SDLP, 1 x DUP, 1 x UUP
2019: 2 x Sinn Féin, 1 x DUP, 1 x UUP, 1 x Alliance, 1 x Independent
2014-2019 Change: Alliance and Independent gain from SDLP (two seats)

West Tyrone

2014: 3 x Sinn Féin, 1 x DUP, 1 x UUP, 1 x SDLP
2019: 3 x Sinn Féin, 1 x DUP, 1 x UUP, 1 x SDLP
2014-2019 Change: No change

* Incumbent

Changes during the term

† Co-options

‡ Changes in affiliation

– Suspensions
None

Last updated 17 November 2022.

Current composition: see Fermanagh and Omagh District Council

References

21st century in County Fermanagh
21st century in County Tyrone
2014 Northern Ireland local elections
Elections in County Fermanagh
Elections in County Tyrone